Trail of the Pink Panther is a 1982 comedy film directed by Blake Edwards and starring Peter Sellers. It is the seventh film in The Pink Panther series, the first film in the series following Sellers's death and also the last in which he appeared as Inspector Clouseau. Sellers died 18 months before production began; his performance consists entirely of scenes from previous films (many of them deleted scenes). The newly shot material in the film stars Joanna Lumley as journalist Marie Jouveat searching for the missing Clouseau – and running afoul of the inspector's enemies who do not wish to see him return.

Plot 
When the famous Pink Panther diamond is stolen again from Lugash, Chief Inspector Clouseau (Peter Sellers) is called on the case despite protests by Chief Inspector Dreyfus (Herbert Lom). While on the case, Clouseau is pursued by the Mafia. Clouseau first goes to London to interrogate Sir Charles Litton (having forgotten that he lives in the South of France). Traveling to the airport, he accidentally blows up his car trying to fix a pop-out lighter, but mistakenly believes it an assassination attempt, and disguises himself in a heavy cast on the flight, which causes complications in the air and on land. He then is led to an awkward introduction to the Scotland Yard detectives at Heathrow. Meanwhile, Dreyfus learns from Scotland Yard that Libyan terrorists have marked Clouseau for assassination, but permits him to continue. At the hotel, Clouseau has a miscommunication with the hotel clerk (Harold Berens) and gets knocked out a window several times, trying to get his message from Dreyfus.

Clouseau's flight disappears over the ocean en route to Lugash, and Marie Jouvet (Joanna Lumley), a television reporter covering the story, sets out to interview those who knew him best. Among the people she interviews are Dreyfus; Hercule Lajoy (Graham Stark); Cato Fong (Burt Kwouk); and former jewel thief Sir Charles Litton (David Niven) who is married to Clouseau's ex-wife Lady Simone (Capucine).

All of these interview scenes provides flashbacks to scenes of earlier Pink Panther films (The Pink Panther, A Shot in the Dark, The Return of the Pink Panther, The Pink Panther Strikes Again, and Revenge of the Pink Panther); but Jouvet also interviews Clouseau's father (Richard Mulligan), at his winery in the south of France, providing glimpses of Clouseau's childhood (wherein he is played by Lucca Mezzofanti), and his early career during college, nearly leading him to commit suicide after a girl of his dreams marries another person, especially in the French Resistance (in which he is played by Daniel Peacock) involving him failing to detonate a bridge full of crossing Nazis. Jouvet also questions Mafia don Bruno Langlois (Robert Loggia), a mafia boss antagonist who would appear in the next film and tries to file a complaint against Langlois with Chief Inspector Dreyfus; but Dreyfus refuses to press charges.

The film ends with Marie hoping that Clouseau might be alive somewhere, as she states: "Did Inspector Clouseau really perish in the sea, as reported? Or for reasons as yet unknown, is he out there someplace, plotting his next move, waiting to reveal himself when the time is right? I am reluctant to believe that misfortune has really struck down such a great man." Clouseau (played by John Taylor, who doubled Sellers in The Fiendish Plot of Dr. Fu Manchu) is seen glancing over a seaside cliff, when a seagull flies over and defecates on the sleeve of his coat. The words "Swine seagull!" are heard in the distinctive exaggerated French accent of Clouseau.

The next shot shows the animated Pink Panther in trench coat and trilby hat, revealed to be in place of Clouseau watching the sunset; he turns around to face the camera and flashes his coat open, but his trench coat reveals a montage of funny clips of Peter Sellers from his five Pink Panther films as a tribute to him, while the end credits roll.

Cast 
 Joanna Lumley as Marie Jouvet
 Herbert Lom as Chief Insp. Charles Dreyfus
 David Niven as Sir Charles Litton (voiced by Rich Little)
 André Maranne as Sgt. François Chevalier
 Robert Loggia as Bruno Langois
 Richard Mulligan as Monsieur Clouseau
 Burt Kwouk as Cato Fong
 Capucine as Lady Simone Litton 
 Graham Stark as Hercule Lajoy
 Ronald Fraser as Dr Longet
 Colin Blakely as Alec Drummond
 Peter Arne as Col. Bufoni
 Harold Kasket as President of Lugash
 Daniel Peacock as Clouseau age 18
 Lucca Mezzofanti as Clouseau age 8
 Denise Crosby as Denise, Bruno's moll

Previously unseen footage only 
 Peter Sellers as Chief Inspector Jacques Clouseau
 Harvey Korman as Prof. Auguste Balls
 Leonard Rossiter as Superintendent Quinlan
 Dudley Sutton as Inspector McLaren
 Marne Maitland as Deputy Commissioner Lasorde
 Liz Smith as Martha
 Harold Berens as Hotel Clerk
 Claire Davenport as Hotel Maid

Previously seen footage only 
 Robert Wagner as George Litton
 Claudia Cardinale as Princess Dala
 Colin Gordon as Tucker

Production 

Sellers died in late July 1980, a year and a half before production began, and his performance was constructed from deleted scenes from The Pink Panther Strikes Again. David Niven appears in the film, reprising his role of Sir Charles Lytton, which he first played in the original The Pink Panther of 1963. Niven was in the early stages of ALS, and his voice subsequently proved too weak to loop his own dialogue during post-production; as a result, his lines were dubbed by impressionist Rich Little.

Returning series regulars include Herbert Lom as Chief Inspector Dreyfus, Graham Stark as Hercule LaJoy (last seen in the 1964 Pink Panther film A Shot in the Dark), Burt Kwouk as Clouseau's faithful man servant Cato and André Maranne as Sgt. François Chevalier. Trail featured the animated opening and closing credits, animated by Marvel Productions and written and directed by Art Leonardi. Director Blake Edwards dedicated the film to Sellers, "the one and only Inspector Clouseau."

Despite the dedication, Sellers's widow Lynne Frederick filed a $3 million lawsuit against the film's producers and MGM/UA, claiming that the film diminished Sellers's reputation, and was awarded over $1 million in damages. Despite this, however, there was a practical reason behind Frederick's suing of Edwards. Her primary objection was that Sellers had actually vetoed the use of outtakes from earlier Panthers in his lifetime and that his estate should have had the right to control the use of outtakes after his death. The reason the question of outtakes being used had come up in Sellers's lifetime was that Edwards had shot and edited a two hour version of Strikes Again, hoping to recapture the zany spectacle of The Great Race, with Dreyfus as the melodramatic villain in the fashion of Jack Lemmon's Professor Fate. United Artists vetoed this long version and the film was drastically cut from two hours to just over an hour and a half.

After Sellers died, UA tried to get Dudley Moore to take on Clouseau in the Sellers-penned Romance of the Pink Panther. Moore refused to do it without Edwards directing and was willing to play Clouseau only one time as a tribute to Sellers (knowing Romance was to have ended the series, according from a Los Angeles Times interview with Moore in 1980). UA wanted the series to continue, but Edwards refused to cast another actor as Clouseau, possibly recalling the negative reception that Inspector Clouseau (1968) suffered upon release. The production featured Alan Arkin in the title role and was without the involvement of Edwards and Sellers.

After Arthur made Moore a huge star, he was unwilling to talk about committing to a film series. MGM/UA wanted a transition film if Edwards was to introduce a new character as the series' star. Using outtakes was, according to Edwards, a brilliant idea (shooting scripts for Return, Strikes Again, and Revenge demonstrate a great amount of comedic material from the three films that was left on the cutting room floor). Edwards had originally hoped to construct a Citizen Kane-esque narrative, with Clouseau having gone missing at the very beginning of the story, whilst the memories of the supporting characters would showcase the deleted or unused content. Unfortunately, MGM/UA refused to pay ITC the fee they were asking for the use of the Return outtakes, and Edwards fell behind schedule on shooting Trail/Curse (MGM/UA also ended up cutting both films' budgets considerably), with the result being that Trail failed to live up to its potential.

Edwards's wife, Julie Andrews, has an unbilled cameo as a cleaning lady, dressed as her friend Carol Burnett's charwoman character.

Soundtrack 
Unusually the soundtrack album by Henry Mancini featured a compilation of themes from other Pink Panther movies, with only "Trail Of The Pink Panther (Main Title)" and "The Easy Life In Paris" being from the film itself. The other tracks included "It Had Better Be Tonight (Meglio Stasera)" (from The Pink Panther), the title theme from A Shot in the Dark, "The Return Of The Pink Panther (Parts I And II)" and "The Greatest Gift" (from The Return of the Pink Panther), "Come To Me", "The Inspector Clouseau Theme" and "Bier Fest Polka" (from The Pink Panther Strikes Again), and "Simone", "After the Shower" and "Hong Kong Fireworks" (from Revenge of the Pink Panther).

The soundtrack album for the film was released by Liberty Records (LT-51139).

Critical and commercial reception 
The film was a critical failure. Although the film was marketed as a tribute to Sellers, the sequel was universally disdained. On review aggregator Rotten Tomatoes, the film has an approval rating of 23% based on 13 reviews, with an average score of 4.30/10. On Metacritic, the film has a weighted average score of 43 out of 100 based on 8 critics, indicating "mixed or average reviews".

It was released for Christmas 1982 and grossed only $9 million – $22,971,889.12 in 2017 dollars ($1,341,695 on opening weekend in 800 theaters; $3,247,458 on opening week) against its $6 million budget. In contrast, the previous film in the series, Revenge of the Pink Panther, had made over $49 million. Nonetheless, it was soon followed by a further Pink Panther film, Curse of the Pink Panther, which was shot concurrently with Trail. That film did not feature Peter Sellers at all (with the exception of some archival voice work, for which he was not given credit) and instead featured Ted Wass as Clouseau's replacement Clifton Sleigh. The latter film was also a critical and commercial disaster.

References

External links 
 
 
 
 

1980s police comedy films
1982 films
American comedy films
American sequel films
British comedy films
British sequel films
Compilation films
Films directed by Blake Edwards
Films scored by Henry Mancini
Films set in 1982
Films shot at Pinewood Studios
Films with live action and animation
Films with screenplays by Blake Edwards
Metro-Goldwyn-Mayer films
The Pink Panther films
United Artists films
1982 comedy films
American films with live action and animation
1980s English-language films
1980s American films
1980s British films